A list of noble families in Modern Belgium with additions of former houses.

General 
Currently, the Belgian crown recognizes the titles of jonkheer, knight, baron, viscount, count, marquis, duke and prince. The persons who legally are member of the nobility have the legal right to protect their family name and coat of arms.

The houses bearing the titles of prince and duke are described more thoroughly on the Belgian nobility page.

Princes 
 d'Arenberg
 de Chimay et de Caraman
 de Croÿ, de Croÿ-Rœulx, de Croÿ-Solre
 de Ligne, de Ligne de la Trémoïlle
 de Lobkowicz
 de Merode
 Swiatopolk-Czetwertynski (Polish princely family whose title was recognized in Belgium in 2007)
 Wellesley

Dukes 
 The Duke of Arenberg
 The Duke of Beaufort-Spontin
 The Duke of Looz-Corswarem
 The Duke of Ursel

Marquesses 
 The Marquess of Beauffort - (only the head of the house, the others are count/countess)
 Imperiali des Princes de Francavilla
 de Mérode (Marquess of Westerlo, created in 1626 by King Philip IV of Spain - only the head of the house, in addition to the title of Prince)
 the Marquess of Assche; head of the van der Noot-family
 the Marquess du Parc Locmaria - (only the head of the house, the others are count/countess)
 de Radiguès Saint-Guédal de Chennevière
 Ruffo de Bonneval de La Fare des Comtes de Sinopoli de 
 the Marquess of Trazegnies d'Ittre
 the Marquess of Yve.- (only the head of the house, the others are count/countess)

Counts

Viscounts

Barons

Knight 
Only men can be knights, ladies can be styled the lower rank of Jonkvrouw.

Ecuyer (jonkheer/jonkvrouw)

References